Todor Kondev (born 16 November 1938) is a Bulgarian gymnast. He competed in eight events at the 1964 Summer Olympics.

References

1938 births
Living people
Bulgarian male artistic gymnasts
Olympic gymnasts of Bulgaria
Gymnasts at the 1964 Summer Olympics
Place of birth missing (living people)